The Western Pennsylvania Model Railroad Museum is a railroad museum in Gibsonia, Pennsylvania.

It is dedicated to the exhibition of model trains and historical railroad paraphernalia.  The museum's main exhibit is a 40' by 100' scale model of the railroad lines connecting Pittsburgh, Pennsylvania and Cumberland, Maryland, accompanied by information on the history of the route and the technical details of its construction.

Other features include a children's area, a gift shop, and a snack bar and a newsagent.

From November to January, the museum also features an annual holiday train show.

References

External links

A record of financial grants to the WPMRM

Railroad museums in Pennsylvania
Model railway shows and exhibitions
Museums in Allegheny County, Pennsylvania